African Mantungwa Community is a minor political party in South Africa.

The party advocates land expropriation without compensation, free education, and support for traditional leaders. It is based in Kwazulu-Natal, and has close ties with the Mantungwa community. It contested in the 2016 municipal election, as well as a number of local government by-elections in Kwazulu Natal, all without success.

The party contested the 2019 South African general election at the provincial level in KwaZulu-Natal only, failing to win a seat.

Election results

Provincial elections

! rowspan=2 | Election
! colspan=2 | Eastern Cape
! colspan=2 | Free State
! colspan=2 | Gauteng
! colspan=2 | KwaZulu-Natal
! colspan=2 | Limpopo
! colspan=2 | Mpumalanga
! colspan=2 | North-West
! colspan=2 | Northern Cape
! colspan=2 | Western Cape
|-
! % !! Seats
! % !! Seats
! % !! Seats
! % !! Seats
! % !! Seats
! % !! Seats
! % !! Seats
! % !! Seats
! % !! Seats
|-
! 2019
| - || -
| - || -
| - || -
| 0.04% || 0/80
| - || -
| - || -
| - || -
| - || -
| - || -
|}

Municipal elections

|-
! Election
! Votes
! %
! Seats
|-
! 2016
| 12,555
| 0.03%
| 0
|-
! 2021
| 5,742
| 0.02%
| 0
|-
|}

References

2015 establishments in South Africa
Political parties in South Africa
Political parties established in 2015